Stefan Dembicki (15 July 1913 – 23 September 1985) was a French football player who played with RC Lens.

He holds the record for most goals scored in a single match, having scored 16 goals in his team's 32–0 win over Auby-Asturies for the first round of the 1942–43 Coupe de France.

Personal life
Dembicki was born in Germany to Polish parents, and moved to France at a young age. He was also known as 'Stanis'.

References

External links
 Player profile at Sitercl.com 
 

1913 births
1985 deaths
French footballers
French people of Polish descent
French people of German descent
German emigrants to France
RC Lens players
Ligue 1 players
Association football forwards